The Zhe school is a school of musicians for the guqin. It should not be confused with the Zhe school of landscape painters.

References
Please see: References section in the guqin article for a full list of references used in all qin related articles.

External links
The Qin in the Song Dynasty

Guqin